A Fish Called Wanda is a 1988 heist comedy film directed by Charles Crichton and written by Crichton and John Cleese. It stars Cleese, Jamie Lee Curtis, Kevin Kline, and Michael Palin. The film follows a gang of diamond thieves who double-cross one another to find stolen diamonds hidden by the gang leader. A barrister becomes a central figure as femme fatale Wanda uses him to locate the loot.

A Fish Called Wanda premiered in New York City on July 7, 1988, and in Los Angeles on July 13, 1988, and was released theatrically on July 15, 1988, by Metro-Goldwyn-Mayer to critical and commercial success, grossing over $188 million worldwide, becoming the seventh-highest-grossing film of 1988. The film received three nominations at the 61st Academy Awards: Best Director, Best Original Screenplay, and, with Kline winning, Best Supporting Actor. A spiritual sequel, Fierce Creatures, was released in 1997. The British Film Institute ranked A Fish Called Wanda the 39th-greatest British film of the 20th century.

Plot
London-based gangster George Thomason plans a jewel heist with his right-hand man, Ken Pile, an animal lover with a stutter. They bring in two Americans: con artist Wanda Gershwitz and weapons expert Otto West, an ignorant and mean-spirited anglophobe. Wanda and Otto are lovers, but pretend to be siblings, so Wanda can work her charms on Ken and George. The heist succeeds and the gang escapes with a large sum in diamonds, which they hide. Wanda and Otto then betray George to the police and he is arrested. They return to collect the loot, with Wanda planning to double-cross Otto as well, but it is gone: George had also returned, and moved it to a safe deposit box, giving Ken the key. Wanda finds it in Ken's fish tank and hides it in her locket.

Wanda decides to seduce George's barrister, Archie Leach, in hopes of learning where the safe deposit box is. Archie is in a loveless marriage and quickly falls for Wanda, but Otto's jealous interference causes their liaisons to go disastrously wrong. Wanda accidentally leaves her locket at Archie's house; his wife, Wendy, delightedly assumes that the W on it means it is a gift for her.

Inventing a reason, Wanda demands that Archie retrieve the locket, but Wendy will not give it up. He finally fakes a robbery at his own home in order to explain its disappearance. Just then, Otto arrives there to apologise to Archie for earlier insults, and decides to help Archie by knocking the burglar unconscious. Archie does get the locket and returns it to Wanda at their next tryst, but they are interrupted. He subsequently telephones her to call off their affair as he now realises she only wants a rich man. Otto arrives at Archie's house again to apologise, but Wendy overhears their conversation and learns about Archie and Wanda.

George asks Ken to kill the Crown's only eyewitness to the robbery, the elderly Eileen Coady, who owns three small dogs. Ken repeatedly tries to kill her, but each time accidentally kills one of the dogs instead, causing him great distress. But he succeeds when the last dog's death gives her a fatal heart attack. With no witness, George seems poised to be released. He gives instructions to Ken, revealing the location of the diamonds. When Otto learns that Ken knows this, he tortures Ken into revealing it by eating Ken's various pet fish, leaving Ken's favourite, named Wanda, until last. Ken reveals that the diamonds are at the Cathcart Towers Hotel near Heathrow Airport, but does not know that Wanda has the key.

With Otto's knowledge and Wanda's key, the two want George to remain in prison. At his trial, Wanda, as a defense witness, unexpectedly gives evidence incriminating him. Archie is stunned by her statements and flubs his questioning,  inadvertently calling her "darling". Wendy, watching from the public gallery, declares their marriage over.

With his career and marriage ruined, Archie resolves to cut his losses, steal the loot himself and flee to South America with Wanda. Promising less prison time, Archie asks George about the diamonds and learns of Otto and Wanda's complicity and that Ken knows their location. Archie sees Wanda fleeing the court and they race to Ken's flat together. As they arrive, Otto steals Archie's car, taking Wanda with him. While Ken stutters uncontrollably, Archie painstakingly gets him to reveal the location of the safe deposit box. They then set out for Heathrow on Ken's moped.

Otto and Wanda recover the diamonds, but Wanda double-crosses Otto and leaves him unconscious in a broom cupboard at Heathrow. She reluctantly boards her flight to Rio de Janeiro without Archie. Otto recovers, steals a boarding pass, and makes his way to the tarmac, where he is confronted by Archie. Otto is about to kill Archie, but Archie stalls him by taunting Otto about America's defeat in Vietnam. Ken arrives, driving a steamroller, seeking vengeance for his fish. Otto finds he has stepped in wet concrete and cannot move; he is run over, but survives. Archie joins Wanda aboard the plane while Otto, clinging to the window outside, curses them until he is blown off during takeoff.

Cast

 John Cleese as Archie Leach
 Jamie Lee Curtis as Wanda Gershwitz
 Kevin Kline as Otto West
 Michael Palin as Ken Pile
 Maria Aitken as Wendy Leach
 Tom Georgeson as George Thomason
 Patricia Hayes as Mrs Eileen Coady
 Geoffrey Palmer as Judge
 Cynthia Cleese as Portia Leach
 Ken Campbell as Bartlett
 Al Ashton as Warder
 Roger Brierley as Davidson
 Llewellyn Rees as Sir John
 Michael Percival as Percival
 Jeremy Child as Mr. Johnson
 Stephen Fry as Hutchison (Cameo)

Production
Cleese and Crichton had attempted to make a film together in 1969. Although the project never entered development, they promised each other that they would eventually collaborate on a film. In June 1983, the two began writing the script for Wanda, and, for the next two and half years, they met three times a month to work on the script. According to Crichton, "We had a week of rehearsals and then a gap of two weeks in which to incorporate any new ideas which had been thrown up and to polish the script." According to Michael Palin, the original title was "A Goldfish Called Wanda."

Cleese told an interviewer that he called his character Archie Leach, actor Cary Grant's real name, because "I feel this film is as near as I'll ever get to being Cary Grant." While in character as Archie Leach, Cleese recited a longer passage from Mikhail Lermontov's poem Молитва ("Prayer").

Cleese, admitting in press interviews that he had no knowledge of how to direct a film, served as co-director, since the studio executives at MGM were worried about Crichton's age—he was 78 years old at the time. On the set, Crichton wore a T-shirt presented to him by Cleese and inscribed "Age and treachery will always overcome youth and skill".

Filming began in England on July 13, 1987 and wrapped on September 21, 1987  after 70 days.

Reception
On Rotten Tomatoes, the film holds a 96% approval rating, based on 67 reviews, with an average rating of 8.1/10. The site's critical consensus reads, "Smartly written, smoothly directed, and solidly cast, A Fish Called Wanda offers a classic example of a brainy comedy with widespread appeal." On Metacritic, the film holds a score of 80 out of 100, based on 17 critics, indicating "generally favorable reviews." According to CriticsTop10, "A Fish Called Wanda" appeared on over 60 critics' top ten lists, making it the fifth most acclaimed film of 1988. Audiences polled by CinemaScore gave the film an average grade of "A" on an A+ to F scale.

After six weeks of wide release in the United States, it reached number one at the box office. It eventually grossed $62.5 million in the United States and Canada. It was the highest-grossing British film of all time with a gross of £12 million. Outside of the US (including the UK), it grossed $126.1 million, for a worldwide total of $188.6 million. It was the number one rental video in the US in 1989.

Kline won an Academy Award for Best Supporting Actor for his performance. Cleese and Crichton received an Academy Award nomination for Best Original Screenplay. Crichton was also nominated for Best Director, Cleese won a BAFTA for Best Actor in a Leading Role and Curtis received nominations for Best Actress in a Leading Role at the Golden Globes and BAFTA awards. Michael Palin won a BAFTA for Best Actor in a Supporting Role and Maria Aitken received a BAFTA nomination for Best Actress in a Supporting Role.

In 2016, Empire magazine ranked A Fish Called Wanda 35th on their list of the 100 best British films, with their entry calling it "a must-own for any British comedy fan", adding, "it made possible Richard Curtis's later Brit-com oeuvre by establishing that British eccentricism can sell, revived the world's interest in Ealing comedies, and allowed a character with Cary Grant's real name – Cleese's bumbling lawyer Archie Leach – to live again on the big screen."

Death of Ole Bentzen
During the initial run of the film, a Danish audiologist named Ole Bentzen died while laughing during a screening, which led newspapers to report that he had died from laughter. The official cause of death was heart fibrillation, which may have been caused by an increased heart rate due to extended laughter. Cleese considered using the event for publicity, but ultimately decided it was in too bad taste.

Accolades

The film is number 27 on Bravo's "100 Funniest Movies". It is also included in the Reader's Digest "100 Funniest Films" list.

In 1999, it was voted 39th on the BFI Top 100 British films list compiled by the British Film Institute

Also in 2000, the American Film Institute placed the film on its 100 Years...100 Laughs list, where it was ranked number 21. Then in 2003, AFI nominated Otto West as a villain from this film for AFI's 100 Years...100 Heroes & Villains.

James Berardinelli of ReelViews awarded the film four out of four stars in his review; it is also number 10 on his "Top 100" list.

Sequels and adaptations
The principal cast reunited in 1997 for Fierce Creatures (dubbed an "equal" rather than a sequel or prequel, by Kline), playing different roles. Fierce Creatures was not as well received by critics or audiences as A Fish Called Wanda.

The novelization of Fierce Creatures, written by Iain Johnstone, who co-wrote the film, begins with a letter from Archie (John Cleese's character in the first film) to his brother Rollo. According to the letter:
Archie and Wanda are still living happily in Rio, and Wanda enjoys having a new child (or multiple children) each year;
Otto visited them once, having left South Africa after Nelson Mandela's election and the end of the apartheid regime; he is looking for like-minded individuals to form a similar group of National Socialists, and Archie and Wanda are both heartily glad when he is gone;
Ken is still master of ceremonies at the London Sea World; before visiting Rio, Otto "looked him up" as if they were old friends, but did not even get close before Ken had security guards throw Otto out of the park.

A loose Indian adaptation, Padmashree Laloo Prasad Yadav, was released in 2005.

In 2008, it was reported that John Cleese and his daughter, Cynthia (who played his screen daughter, Portia), had started to work on a stage musical version of the film.

See also
 BFI Top 100 British films
 Michael Palin Centre for Stammering

References

External links

 
 
 
 
 
 

1988 films
1988 comedy films
1980s crime comedy films
1980s heist films
American crime comedy films
American heist films
British crime comedy films
British heist films
1980s English-language films
Films about con artists
Films about fish
Films directed by Charles Crichton
Films featuring a Best Supporting Actor Academy Award-winning performance
Films scored by John Du Prez
Films set in London
Films with screenplays by John Cleese
Metro-Goldwyn-Mayer films
Films shot in Oxfordshire
1980s American films
1980s British films